The Missouri Wall of Fame is a  span of flood wall in downtown Cape Girardeau, Missouri, covered with a mural of 45 panels depicting 46 or 47 famous people who were born in the state or achieved fame while living there. The names were chosen by "a panel of the Cape's leading citizens" and it was painted in 1995, designed by local artist Margaret Dement.

Those depicted on the wall include:

See also
Hall of Famous Missourians

References

History of Missouri
Lists of people from Missouri
Halls of fame in Missouri
State halls of fame in the United States
American paintings
Murals in Missouri
Art in Missouri